Lakshminarayan Lal (1927–1987) was an Indian playwright, critic and a novelist who wrote in Hindi. He worked in many genres of literature but received fame as a playwright. His contributions as a reviewer were significant.

Early life 
Laxminarayan Lal was born on March 4, 1927, in Jalalpur, Basti district of Uttar Pradesh. He earned a Doctor of Philosophy. degree, with his thesis on the topic "Development of the craft method of Hindi stories." Lal grew up primarily as a playwright and had an affinity for drama and theatrics in his childhood. His childhood was spent in a rural environment. He was introduced at a very young age with folk dramas like Ramlila, Nautanki, Bidesia etc.

He died on 20th November 1987 in Delhi.

Career 
Lal was as a story writer, novelist, playwright, and critic, who produced significant works in all these segments.

Theatrical literature 
Lal composed about 35 full-length plays, many of which were also staged by well-known theatrical directors. He wrote his first play Andha Kuan in 1955. Since then, he not only continued to write plays but also ran a theater center in Allahabad, in which he offered both theatrical training and performance with very limited means.

In his plays, there is often an attempt to see the experiences of ordinary life from a deeper, and different perspective. The mythological-historical setting as well as the realistic environment, experimentation, meaningful use of symbols and images, the complexity of human relations - especially the male-female relationship - the openness and the depiction of multi-layered situations, etc. have linked his plays to their soil and tradition. Laxminarayan Lal is well-known as an important playwright of the post-independence era.

Fiction 
Apart from being a playwright, and even before that, Laxminarayan Lal was also a storyteller and has authored a large number of novels.  In 1951, his first novel Dharti Ki Aankhen was published. Then about a dozen of his novels were published. The background of these novels is often of middle-class civic life and sometimes even rural life. Various moods of love are also at the center of these novels. In these novels, there are realistic and poignant glimpses of life, at times the story of cultural struggle is told in the middle-class conflict, and occasionally there is a collision of new circumstances and orthodox ideals. The formulation of many new and old problems in changing contexts is not only extroverted - the inner feelings are also portrayed with humility. Along with the inclusion of folk life and folk elements in the style, symbolism has also been included.

Apart from novels, Lal has also written stories and many of his short story collections have been published by publishers. Most of his stories are spontaneous experiences of rural life. There are also a good number of stories centered on love. In fact, the reality of Lal's stories is both internal and external, that is, they contain the inner world of the mind and the outside political-economic pressure. Along with the mutual reality of male-female psychology and their relationship, these stories also depict the complex economic-social problems of today's villages.

Review work 
Lal was associated with stories from the very beginning. He wrote his dissertation on stories for his Ph.D.  In addition to the work titled "Shilp Vidhi Ka Vikas of Hindi Stories", a review book titled Modern Hindi Story written for the Sahitya Akademi is also a work of literature review.

Due to his versatility and multifaceted work experience, Lal's field of experience was also a broad one. This is the reason that he also made a remarkable contribution in the field of theatrical review. His review books Theatre and The Role of Drama and Modern Hindi Drama and Theatre are based on personal experience and enriched with an observant study of Indian and Western traditions. In the third book 'Parsi Hindi Theatre', the history and characteristics of Parsi theatre have been outlined.

Other activities 
Lal was directly associated with various aspects of Rangakarma. He was also a theatre director and actor. The first play he directed was the self-composed Mada Cactus. Apart from this, he also directed and acted in many other plays. The establishment of the institutions Natya Kendra (1958) in Allahabad and Samvad (1967) in Delhi is proof of their association with the totality of theatre. He taught drama subjects in colleges and also worked as a drama producer on All India Radio.

Published works

Drama
 Andha Kuan (1956)
 Maada Kaiktas (1959)
 Sundar Raash (1959)
 Sukha Sarovar (1960)
 Natak tota Maina (1962)
 Ratrani (1962)
 Darpan (1964)
 Suryamukh (1968)
 Kalki (1969)
 Mr Abhimanyu (1971)
 Curfew (1972)
 Dusra Darwaja (1972)
 Abdullah Deewana (1973)
 Yaksha Prashna (1974)
 Vyaktigat (1974)
 Ek Satya Harishchandra (1976)
 Sagun Panchi (1977)
 Sab Rang Mohbhang (1977)
 Ram ki Ladaai (1979)
 Punch Purush 
 Lanka Khand
 Ganga Mati
 Narasimha Katha
 Chandrama

Solitary Collections
 Parvat ke Peechhe (1952)
 Nāṭaka bahurūpī (1964)
 Taajamahal ke Aansoo (1970)
 Mere Shreshth Ekaankee (1972)

Novels
 Dharatee kee Aankhen (1951)
 Baya ka Ghonsala Aur Saamp (1951)
 Kaale Phool ka Paudha (1951)
 Rupajiva (1959)
 Badi Champa Choti Champa
 Mana Vrindavan
 Prem Ek Apavitr Nadee (1972)
 Apna-Apna Raakshas (1973)
 Badke Bhaiya (1973)
 Hara Samandar Gopi Chander (1974)
 Vasant kee Prateeksha (1975)
 Shrngaar (1975)
 Devina (1976)
 Purushottam

Stories
 Aane Waala kal (1957)
 Lady Doctor (1958)
 Sune Aangan Ras Barsai (1960)
 Naye Svar Nayee Rekhaen
 Ek Aur khani
 Ek Bund Jaal
 Dakuu Aaye (1974)
 Meree Pratinidhi kahaaniyaan

Research & Review
 Hindee kahaaniyon kee Shilp-vidhi ka Vikaas (1953)
 Adhunik Hindi Kahani 
 Rungmanch aur Unki Bhumika 
 Parsi Hindi Rangmanch 
 Aadhunik Hindi Natak and Rangmanch 
 Rangmanch: Dekhna and Jaanana

Legacy 
Laxminarayan Lal was honored as the best playwright by the Sangeet Natak Akademi in 1977. He was awarded for literary contribution by the Sahitya Kala Parishad in 1979 and by the Hindi Academy in 1987.

See also 
Mahadevi Verma
Bharatendu Harishchandra

References

External links
 

Indian literary critics
Indian dramatists and playwrights
Indian novelists
Indian storytellers
Indian critics
1927 births
1967 deaths
Recipients of the Sangeet Natak Akademi Award